The Anti-Spyware Coalition (ASC) was a group formed in 2005 with the goal to build a consensus about definitions and best practices in the debate surrounding spyware.

Composed of anti-spyware software companies, academics, and consumer groups, the ASC seeks to bring together a diverse array of perspective on the problem of controlling spyware and other potentially unwanted technologies.

History

Formed in 2005 after the dissolution of the Consortium of Anti-Spyware Technology Vendors (COAST) which broke up over internal dissent.   In April 2005 Ari Schwartz called together the initial group of Anti-Spyware companies; others later joined. A series of documents was published, and feedback solicited.  The first set of documents consisted of a definition of spyware and potentially unwanted technologies, and a vendor dispute resolution process.  This was followed by a "Risk Model" providing Anti-Spyware vendors with a framework for classifying software. In March 2007 the ASC published the public final draft of their Best Practices document.

References

External links
Anti-spyware guidelines get final version

Spyware